Ian Stanley MacKenzie (27 September 1950 – 2018) was an English professional footballer who played in the Football League for Mansfield Town, Sheffield United and Southend United.

References

1950 births
2018 deaths
English footballers
Association football defenders
English Football League players
Sheffield United F.C. players
Mansfield Town F.C. players
Southend United F.C. players
Alfreton Town F.C. players